Irina Bogushevskaya (born 2 November 1965) is a Russian singer, poet, and composer of theater jazz and cabaret rock. Her largest event was a one-woman concert at the Kremlin Palace in 2005, which drew 6,000 people.

Discography
 Kniga Pesen (Книга песен, Book of Songs), 1998
 Brazilsky Kreyser (Бразильский крейсер, Brazil Cruiser), 2000
 Legkiye Lyudi (Легкие люди, Easy People), 2001
 Shou dly Tebya Odnoy (Шоу для тебя одной, Show for You Alone)- live concert, 2003
 Nezhnye Veshchi (Нежные вещи, Gentle Things), 2004
 Shelk ( Шелк, Silk), 2010

References

External links
 Her Facebook account
 CD on amazon.com
 Last.fm site
 CDuniverse
 Official YouTube channel

1965 births
Living people
Russian composers
Russian women poets
Soviet women singers
Singers from Moscow
20th-century Russian women singers
20th-century Russian singers
Russian chanson